Mochrum is a coastal civil and Church of Scotland parish situated to the east of Luce Bay on the Machars peninsula and  southwest of Wigtown and in the historical county of Wigtownshire in Galloway, Scotland. The parish contains the eponymous village of Mochrum, as well as Port William and the clachan of Elrig.

Etymology 
Mochrum is recorded as Mochrumm in Blaeu as a hill-name. It is a Cumbric name formed of the elements moch 'pigs, swine' and drum 'ridge'. It is possible, but unlikely, that the name is Gaelic rather than Cumbric, formed of the cognate elements muc-druim.

Kirk of Mochrum

Mochrum kirk was built on the site of a previous church building dating back to the 12th century. The former building was largely destroyed by fire in the 1770s, and the current building used most of the former building's rectangular walls in its construction in 1794, and was substantially altered again ca. 1840.

The churchyard contains ten war graves, of which four male and one female are unknown.

History
Sir John Dunbar of Mochrum was killed at the Battle of Flodden in 1513. He was survived by his wife Janet Stewart, and his third son Gavin Dunbar (1490-1547), became Archbishop of Glasgow in 1524. A fortified mediaeval manor house is located at Castle Island, also called Drumwalt.

Myretoun McCulloch was owned by the McCullochs, and in 1574 they had the 5-merkland of Balsalloch in the "Barony of Myretoun". Myretoun Castle is on the Monreith Estate, on the border of Mochrum and Glasserton parishes. It was owned by Sir William Maxwell, and then the Maxwells built Monreith House.  Myrtoun Castle was built on an earlier motte, but was there also a castle and motte on the island.

Archaeology

Mochrum is the site of numerous prehistoric forts, earthworks, standing stones, and crannógs

About  from Monreith is Barsalloch Point, where evidence of human encampments as early as 6000 BC may make it the oldest dated settlement in Galloway.

Barsalloch Iron Age fort at Mochrum, as well as both early and medieval crosses. There is another Iron Age hill fort at Doon of May hill fort.

The foundations are all that is left of Chapel Finian, a 10th-11th-century chapel standing on an old raised beach at Corwall Port. It most likely takes its name from Saint Finnian who was educated at nearby Whithorn and died ca. 579 AD.  The site was probably a landing place for Irish pilgrims to Saint Ninian's shrine.  It is shown on Timothy Pont's map in Blaeu's Atlas, as "Chappel finan".

The Old Place of Mochrum was built in 1368.

A crannog is in Elrig Loch. A standing stone, the Carlin Stone, can be found on The Derry, near to the head of Elrig Loch. The ruins of a mediaeval chapel can be found at Barhobble, which is near to the House of Elrig.

See also
List of listed buildings in Mochrum, Dumfries and Galloway

Gallery

References

Wigtownshire
Parishes in Dumfries and Galloway
Villages in Dumfries and Galloway